Eric Butorac and Jamie Murray were the defending champions. They were both present but did not compete together. 
Butorac partnered with Bobby Reynolds, but lost in the first round to Murray and partner Jeff Coetzee.
Murray partnered with Jeff Coetzee, but Bruno Soares and Kevin Ullyett defeated them 6–2, 7–6(7–5), in the final.

Seeds

Draw

Draw

External links
 Draw

Doubles